Dejan Vasić (Serbian Cyrillic: Дејан Васић; born December 31, 1980) is a Serbian footballer who lastly played for FK Šumadija Radnički 1923. He previously played for FK Budućnost Banatski Dvor and FK Banat Zrenjanin.

External links
Profile at Srbijafudbal.
Profile at Dekisa.tripod.

1980 births
Living people
Footballers from Belgrade
Serbian footballers
Association football midfielders
FK Budućnost Banatski Dvor players
FK Banat Zrenjanin players
FK Sloga Kraljevo players
FK Radnički 1923 players
Serbian SuperLiga players